The 1995 Rugby League Premiership was the 21st end of season Rugby League Premiership competition. Played during the 1994–95 Rugby Football League season, the winners were Wigan. Kris Radlinski was named man-of-the-match so was awarded the Harry Sunderland Trophy.

First round

Semi-finals

Final

Notes

References
 

Premiership